H band may refer to:
 H band (infrared), an atmospheric transmission window centred on 1.65 μm
 H band (NATO), a radio frequency band from 6 to 8 GHz
 H band, part of the sarcomere

See also 
 H line (disambiguation)